Five Points is a retail corridor and neighborhood in Athens, Georgia, centered on the intersection of Milledge Avenue and Lumpkin Street. It occupies the South-Southwest edge of the University of Georgia campus. Milledge Avenue is home to many University of Georgia Greek chapter houses, and is included in a tour by the Athens Welcome Center.

References 

Neighborhoods in Athens, Georgia